The Amazing Race 4 is the fourth season of the American reality television show The Amazing Race. It featured twelve teams of two in a race around the world.

The season premiered on CBS on May 29, 2003, and concluded on August 21, 2003.

Married couple Reichen Lehmkuhl and Chip Arndt were the winners of the season, while engaged couple Jon Corso and Kelly Parks finished in second place, and best friends David Dean and Jeff Strand finished in third.

Production

Filming for the show began on January 18, 2003, and finished on February 14.

This was the last season where ties at the end were allowed at the mat. In subsequent seasons, even if several teams arrived at the mat on the same time, a chronological order would be determined and the official check-in times for teams arriving simultaneously would be set a minute apart to avoid ties. This was also the last season where a Fast Forward appeared in every leg.

In 2004, this season of The Amazing Race won the series its second consecutive Primetime Emmy Award for Outstanding Reality Competition Program.

Cast

This season's cast included a gay married couple, NFL wives, a pair of circus clowns, and air traffic controllers. The "NFL Wives", Monica & Sheree, were respectively married to Ashley Ambrose and Ray Buchanan, both of whom played for the Atlanta Falcons the season before the television series was filmed. At the time this season was filmed and broadcast, same-sex marriage had not yet been made legal in the United States. Reichen & Chip were never legally married, although they were married in a religious ceremony. CBS decided for the purpose of the show to respect the fact that they recognized themselves as a married couple. Not long after the season ended, Reichen revealed that he and Chip had separated.

Future appearances
In 2005, Reichen Lehmkuhl appeared on a "Reality All-Stars" episode of Fear Factor. Reichen also appeared as part of the cast of The A-List: New York in 2011. Monica & Sheree, now both divorced, appeared on Atlanta Exes in 2014.

Results
The following teams are listed with their placements in each episode. Placements are listed in finishing order. 
A  placement with a dagger indicates that the team was eliminated. 
An  placement with a double-dagger indicates that the team was the last to arrive at a pit stop in a non-elimination leg. 
A  indicates that the team won the Fast Forward.

Notes

Race summary

Leg 1 (United States → Italy)

Episode 1: "Cheaters Never Win... and They Cheated!" (May 29, 2003)
Prize: A vacation to Hawaii (awarded to Amanda & Chris, Millie & Chuck, and Steve & Josh)
Eliminated: Debra & Steve
Locations
Los Angeles, California (Dodger Stadium) (Starting Line)
 Los Angeles → Milan, Italy
Milan (Galleria Vittorio Emanuele II)
 Milan (Piazza Fontana) → Cortina d'Ampezzo (Church of St. Filippo and Giacomo)
Cortina d'Ampezzo (Passo Giau) 
Cortina d'Ampezzo (Cinque Torri) 
Cortina d'Ampezzo (Hotel Lajadira) 
Episode summary
At the start of the race, teams set off from Dodger Stadium and drove themselves to Los Angeles International Airport, where they booked one of three flights to Milan, Italy. Four teams flew on a Swiss Air flight that departed first and arrived first, three teams on a Lufthansa flight that arrived second, and five teams on a KLM flight that arrived last. Once in Milan, teams had to make their way to the Galleria Vittorio Emanuele II, where they had to search the shopping complex for tickets on one of three charter buses leaving the next day for an unknown destination (Cortina d'Ampezzo in the Dolomite Mountains).
At the Church of St. Filippo and Giacomo, teams had to follow a marked path to find their next clue, which directed them to the Cinque Torri. There, teams had to ride a ski lift to the top and find their next clue on the mountain.
 This season's first Fast Forward required one team had to find a field on Passo Giau, put on snowshoes, and trek to the top of a snowy hill. Monica & Sheree won the Fast Forward.
 This season's first Detour was a choice between Search or Rescue. In Search, teams would have had to use a locator beacon to find a beeper hidden somewhere within a  snow-covered area. After finding it, they'd have dug in search of a set of keys for a snowmobile that they could have then driven to their next clue. In Rescue, teams made their way to marked rock towers and crossed a traditional alpine rescue bridge of four steel cables. All teams chose to cross the rescue bridge and use the zip-line.
After completing the Detour, teams had to ride the ski lift back down to the lodge and then make their way to the pit stop: the Hotel Lajadira.

Leg 2 (Italy)

Episode 2: "It Doesn't Say Anything About First Come First Served... and We're Bigger" (June 5, 2003)
Eliminated: Amanda & Chris
Locations
Cortina d'Ampezzo (Hotel Lajadira) 
Cortina d'Ampezzo (Trampolino Olimpico)
 Calalzo di Cadore  Ponte nelle Alpi → Venice
Venice (Ponte delle Guglie → Campo Querini Stampalia) 
Venice (Campo San Vio ) 
Venice (Palazzo da Mosto) 
Venice (Venetian Lagoon – Citta di Padova) 
Episode summary
At the start of this leg, teams traveled to the Trampolino Olimpico. There, they took a van to the top of the hill and then rode a large inflatable snow raft down the hill in order to receive their next clue, which instructed them to travel by train to Venice. Once in Venice, teams had to find their next clue at the Ponte delle Guglie.
 This leg's Detour was a choice between Waterway or Pathway. In Waterway, teams had to travel by gondola, using only a map to guide their gondolier and without being allowed to ask locals for directions, to the Campo Querini Stampalia, where they found their next clue. In Pathway, teams had to travel by foot through the city's streets and bridges to the same plaza, but without a map, although they could ask for directions.
 This leg's Fast Forward required one team to go to Campo San Vio and join a group of actors performing street theater known as commedia dell'arte until the Fast Forward award appeared in the skit. Steve & Dave won the Fast Forward.
 In this season's first Roadblock, one team member had to choose a picture of a Venetian mask, enter the Palazzo da Mosto, and search among rooms filled with masked revelers to find the one wearing the same mask shown in their photo, who gave them their next clue. If they chose incorrectly, the reveler simply took the photo and walked away, and the team member had to go back outside to wait to receive another photo, since only four contestants could enter at a time.
Teams had to check in at the pit stop: the Citta di Padova, moored at the Venetian Lagoon.

Leg 3 (Italy → Austria)

Episode 3: "I Wasn't Even Going to Touch You Until You Slammed My Head Backwards" (June 12, 2003)
Eliminated: Russell & Cindy
Locations
Venice (Laguna Veneta – Citta di Padova) 
 Venice → Vienna, Austria
Vienna (Vienna Sewers – Intersection of Friedrichstraße & Operngasse  → Heumarkt)
Vienna (Stadtpark)
Vienna (Schönbrunn Palace) 
Vienna (Mozart House  Beethoven House) 
Vienna (Donauturm) 
 Vienna → Gmunden
Gmunden (Schloss Ort) 
Episode summary
At the start of this leg, teams were instructed to travel by train to Vienna, Austria. Once there, they had to enter the city's historic sewers at the intersection of Friedrichstraße and Operngasse and follow a marked path to the Johann Strauss II Monument at the Stadtpark, where they found their next clue. Teams then had to flag down a horse-drawn carriage called a fiacre and grab the ticket hanging on the carriage door for one of three departure times. Teams then directed their fiacre to Schönbrunn Palace, where they found their next clue.
 This leg's Detour was a choice between Mozart or Beethoven. In Mozart, teams had to carry a string bass  to the well-known house where Wolfgang Amadeus Mozart wrote The Marriage of Figaro in order to receive their next clue. In Beethoven, teams had to carry a portfolio of sheet music  to a lesser-known house where Ludwig van Beethoven wrote The Heiligenstadt Testaments in order to receive their next clue.
 This leg's Fast Forward required one team to enter the ballroom at Schönbrunn Palace, where each team member had to carry a tray full of champagne glasses across the room and through the crowd of waltzing couples without spilling any of the drinks. Steve & Josh won the Fast Forward.
After completing the Detour, teams were instructed to travel to the Donauturm.
 In this leg's Roadblock, one team member had to perform a  bungee jump off the Donauturm in order to receive their next clue. 
After completing the Roadblock, teams had to travel by train to Gmunden and then on foot to the pit stop at the Schloss Ort.
Additional notes
The bungee jump at the Donauturm was later featured as a Switchback/Fast Forward in season 23, but due to high winds, the Fast Forward was unavailable, and no teams chose to wait for weather conditions to improve.

Leg 4 (Austria → France)

Episode 4: "Check Your Tires Because... Oh God, You Never Know What'll Happen!" (June 19, 2003)
Eliminated: Steve & Josh
Locations
Gmunden (Schloss Ort) 
 Gmunden → Salzburg  Munich, Germany
 Salzburg  Munich → Paris, France
 Paris → Le Mans
Le Mans (Circuit de la Sarthe – Circuit Bugatti) 
Marseille (Phare de Sainte Marie)
Aix-en-Provence (Musée de Tapisseries) 
Bagnols-en-Forêt (Gorges du Blavet – Point de Vue du VAR) 
Saint-Rémy-de-Provence (Château des Alpilles) 
Episode summary
At the start of this leg, teams were instructed to fly to Paris, France, and then travel by train to Le Mans. To get to Paris, teams traveled by train to either Salzburg or Munich, Germany, and then flew to Paris. Once in Le Mans, teams had to make their way to the Circuit de la Sarthe in order to find their next clue.
 In this leg's Roadblock, one team member had to change four tires on a race car and then drive a high-speed lap around the Circuit Bugatti with a professional driver. Once the lap was ended, they received their next clue at the winners' podium.
After completing the Roadblock, teams had to drive themselves to the Phare de Sainte Marie lighthouse in Marseille in order to find their next clue.
 This leg's Fast Forward required one team to find the Musée de Tapisseries in Aix-en-Provence and then arrange a 20-piece puzzle to form a picture of the pit stop: the Château des Alpilles. Tian & Jaree won the Fast Forward.
 This leg's Detour was a choice between Ropes or Slopes. In Ropes, teams had to rappel  down a cliff and then hike a short way to the clue below. In Slopes, teams would have had to walk a much longer sloping trail to the same clue. All teams chose to rappel down the cliff.
Teams had to check in at the pit stop: the Château des Alpilles in Saint-Rémy-de-Provence.

Leg 5 (France → Netherlands)

Episode: "You Are Just Deliberately Trying to Make Us Lose!" (June 26, 2003)
Prize: A seven-day Mexican Riviera cruise (awarded to Millie & Chuck)
Eliminated: Steve & Dave
Locations
Saint-Rémy-de-Provence (Château des Alpilles) 
 Marseille → Amsterdam, Netherlands
 Amsterdam (Magere Brug → Scheepvaart Museum)
Amsterdam (Molen van Sloten) 
Alkmaar (Alkmaar Cheese Market)  Zuiderwoude (Ranch) 
Monnickendam (Smoker Statue) 
Muiden (Kasteel Muiderslot) 
Episode summary
At the beginning of this leg, teams were instructed to fly to Amsterdam, Netherlands. Once there, teams had to find the "White Skinny Bridge" (the Magere Brug), where they found their next clue. Teams had to take a marked boat and, using a provided map, navigate through the Amsterdam canals to the Scheepvaart Museum in order to find their next clue.
 This leg's Detour was a choice between 500 Kilograms or 15 Feet. In 500 Kilograms, teams drove  to Alkmaar's outdoor market, donned traditional wooden clogs, and used a wooden stretcher to carry cheese from a stockpile to a scale. Once they'd transported exactly  of cheese, teams received their next clue.
 This leg's Fast Forward required one team to travel to the Molen van Sloten. There, each team member was strapped onto the sails of the windmill and had to endure ten complete rotations once the windmill was set in motion. Millie & Chuck won the Fast Forward.
 In this leg's Roadblock, one team member had to get on a marked boat, catch 25 eels with their hands, and put them in a container in order to receive their next clue.
Teams had to check in at the pit stop: the Muiden Castle in Muiden.

Leg 6 (Netherlands → India)

Episode: "I Could Have Never Been Prepared For What I'm Looking at Right Now" (July 3, 2003)
Prize: A seven-night cruise to Hubbard Glacier (awarded to David & Jeff)
Eliminated: Monica & Sheree
Locations
Muiden (Kasteel Muiderslot) 
 Amsterdam → Mumbai, India
 Mumbai (Film City)
Mumbai (Dhobi Ghat  P. Amarlel Clothing Shop) 
Mumbai (Sassoon Docks – Indo Universal Engineering) 
Mumbai (Gateway of India) 
Episode summary
At the beginning of this leg, teams were instructed to fly to Mumbai, India. Once there, teams had to make their way to Film City, where they were directed to ride bicycles through the sprawling movie backlot to a Bollywood sound stage in order to find their next clue.
 This leg's Detour was a choice between Suds or Duds. In Suds, teams had to find an outdoor laundromat in Dhobi Ghat and hand-wash a bundle of clothing in order to reveal their next clue imprinted on one piece of clothing. In Duds, teams had to locate a clothing shop and search through hundreds of saris in order to find one imprinted with the clue.
 In this leg's Roadblock, one team member had to carry twenty Palai fish out of a large catch of mixed fish to the market manager in order to receive their next clue.
Teams had to check in at the pit stop: the Gateway of India in Mumbai.

Leg 7 (India)

Episode 7: "We're Going Down the Wrong Side of The Freeway... and the Lights Are Off!" (July 10, 2003)
Prize: A seven-night cruise to the Western Caribbean (awarded to David & Jeff)
Eliminated: Tian & Jaree
Locations
Mumbai (Gateway of India) 
 Panvel → Ernakulam Junction
Ernakulam (National Highway 47) 
Alleppey (Sports Field near Pallathuruthy Bridge on Alappuzha–Changanassery Highway) 
Alleppey (Beach Road) 
Alleppey (Punnamada Lake – The Finishing Point) 
Episode summary
At the start of this leg, teams were instructed to travel by overnight train to Ernakulam Junction in the Ernakulam neighborhood of Kochi. Once there, teams had to search along a stretch of highway for a clue hidden amongst thousands of yellow-and-red billboards.
 In this leg's Roadblock, one team member had to take part in bull racing by hanging onto a team of bulls running across a mud course the length of a football field in order to receive their next clue.
 This leg's Detour was a choice between Baskets or Trunks. In Baskets, teams had to load ten live chickens into baskets on a bicycle-powered wagon and then pedal to a farm, where they could exchange the chickens for their next clue. In Trunks, teams had to load two bales of coir onto an elephant and then ride the elephant to a coir shop, trading their cargo for their next clue.
Teams had to check in at the pit stop: Punnamada Lake in Alleppey.

Leg 8 (India → Malaysia)

Episode 8: "The Priestess Reminded Me of My Grandmother. She Was Very Old But Still Very, Very With It" (July 17, 2003)
Prize: A vacation to Mexico (awarded to Jon & Al)
Locations
Alleppey (Punnamada Lake – The Finishing Point) 
 Kochi → Kota Kinabalu, Malaysia
Penampang (Monsopiad Cultural Village) 
 Kota Kinabalu (Kota Kinabalu Boat Jetty) 
 Tunku Abdul Rahman National Park (Manukan Island)  
Episode summary
At the beginning of this leg, teams were instructed to fly to Kota Kinabalu, Malaysia, in Malaysian Borneo. Once there, teams went to the Monsopiad Cultural Village, where they received a traditional Malaysian blessing and their next clue. They were directed to travel to Jesselton Point, which was referred to as the "Kota Kinabalu Boat Jetty", and had to choose a marked boat that took them to a fishing trawler, where they found their next clue.
 This leg's Detour was a choice between Net or Trap. In Net, teams had to take their boat to a marked fishing platform and use a net to catch fifteen fish out of a marked pen in order to receive their next clue. In Trap, teams had to take their boat to a group of marked lobster boats and pull up one weighted lobster trap in order to get the clue from inside.
 In this leg's Roadblock, one team member had to hit three targets using three different Malaysian weapons: a bow and arrow, a blowpipe, and a spear. After successfully hitting all three targets, teams could run to the nearby pit stop.
Additional notes
This was a non-elimination leg.

Leg 9 (Malaysia)

Episode 9: "We're Not at Charm School Learning How to Be a Gentleman, We're Racing" (July 24, 2003)
Prize: A Latin American vacation (awarded to Reichen & Chip)
Eliminated: Millie & Chuck
Locations
Tunku Abdul Rahman National Park (Manukan Island) 
Ranau (Poring Hot Springs)
Sepilok (Sepilok Orangutan Sanctuary) 
Sandakan (Trushidup Palm Oil Plantation) 
Kinabatangan (Gomantong Caves) 
Sepilok (Sepilok Nature Resort) 
Episode summary
At the start of this leg, teams were instructed to travel by boat back to the mainland.
 This leg's Fast Forward required one team to drive to the Sepilok Orangutan Sanctuary. There, the team had to hike to a feeding station in the jungle and then feed two pieces of fruit to an orangutan. Reichen & Chip won the Fast Forward.
 This leg's Detour was a choice between Chop or Haul. In Chop, teams had to use local tools to chop down palm nut bunches with a clue attached. However, only one out of every four envelopes contained a clue. In Haul, teams used a wheelbarrow to carry 25 palm nut bunches to a matching truck. When the truck was fully loaded, it drove forward and revealed their next clue underneath.
Teams had to check in at the pit stop: the Sepilok Nature Resort.

Leg 10 (Malaysia → South Korea)

Episode 10: "That's Me. That's My Face. Just Hit My Face. Hit My Face!" (July 31, 2003)
Prize: A Caribbean vacation (awarded to Kelly & Jon)
Locations
Sepilok (Sepilok Nature Resort) 
Sandakan (Puu Jih Shih Temple)
 Kota Kinabalu → Seoul, South Korea
Seoul (Namsan Park – Seoul Tower)
Cheorwon (Hantan River, Sundam Valley – Rafting Korea) 
Seoul (Subway Station 228)  
Seoul (Taekwondo Dojang  Restaurant) 
Seoul (Gyeongbokgung Palace – Geunjeongjeon Hall) 
Episode summary
At the start of this leg, teams were instructed to travel to the Puu Jih Shih Temple, where they searched through thousands of tiny Buddha figurines for one with their names on it. Behind the figurine was a key to a rattan bag holding their next clue, which instructed them to fly to Seoul, South Korea. Once there, teams had to travel to Namsan Park and find their next clue at the base of the Seoul Tower.
 In this leg's Roadblock, one team member had to plunge into the icy Hantan River and swim under the ice to an exit hole. Once their body temperature rose to a safe level, a doctor cleared them to leave and gave them their next clue.
After completing the Roadblock, teams were instructed to travel back to Seoul and to search Station 228 of the Seoul Metropolitan Subway in order to find their next clue.
 This leg's Detour was a choice between Strong Hands or Strong Stomach. In Strong Hands, teams used a map to find a Taekwondo dojang, where each team member had to break three sets of wooden boards in order to receive their next clue. In Strong Stomach, teams used a map to find a restaurant where each team member had to eat a Korean delicacy called san-nakji – raw octopus – in order to receive their next clue.
Teams had to check in at the pit stop: Gyeongbokgung Palace in Seoul.
Additional notes
This was a non-elimination leg.

Leg 11 (South Korea → Australia)

Episode 11: "Such a Nice Pheromone Smell to You; Just Makes Me Want to Stay Close to You" (August 7, 2003)
Prize: A vacation to Mexico (awarded to David & Jeff)
Eliminated: Jon & Al
Locations
Seoul (Gyeongbokgung Palace – Geunjeongjeon Hall) 
Seoul (Yeouido Island – Hangang Park)
 Seoul → Brisbane, Australia
Sunshine Coast (Beach) 
Brisbane (City Centre – Holiday Inn) 
Mooloolaba (UnderWater World) 
Mooloolaba (Mooloolaba Yacht Club) 
Episode summary
At the beginning of this leg, teams were instructed to go to Hangang Park, where they had to pull on a string in order to release their next clue dangling from a kite. This clue instructed teams to fly to Brisbane, Australia. Once there, teams had to travel to the Holiday Inn hotel and find the concierge, who led them to the penthouse, where they found their next clue.
 This leg's Detour was a choice between Face First or Foot First. In Face First, teams had to complete a face-first rappel from the penthouse to the ground – a  descent – in order to receive their next clue. In Foot First, teams would have had to locate a nearby Sheraton hotel, race downstairs from the penthouse, across the street, and then up thirty stories to the roof where they would have received their next clue. All teams chose to do the face-first rappel.
 This season's final Fast Forward required one team to drive an hour away to a beach on the Sunshine Coast and pass a lifeguard test by paddling surfboards in a heavy surf, pulling a swimmer out of the water, and returning her safely to the beach. David & Jeff won the Fast Forward.
After completing the Detour, teams drove to UnderWater World in Mooloolaba, where they found their next clue.
 In this leg's Roadblock, one team member had to don scuba gear, walk through an aquarium filled with sharks and rays, and then retrieve their clue from a treasure chest on the aquarium floor.
After completing the Roadblock, teams had to travel on foot to the next pit stop at the nearby Mooloolaba Yacht Club.

Leg 12 (Australia)

Episode 12: "He's A Couple of Ticks Away From Having a Heart Attack" (August 14, 2003)
Prize: A vacation to Europe (awarded to David & Jeff)
Locations
Mooloolaba (Mooloolaba Yacht Club) 
Ferny Hills (Australian Woolshed)
 Brisbane → Cairns
Cairns (Wild World)
Wangetti (Wangetti Beach) 
Julatten (Off Road Rush) 
Ellis Beach (Ellis Beach) 
Episode summary
At the beginning of this leg, teams had to search through one of three huge piles of wool in Ferny Hills for their next clue, which instructed them to fly to Cairns. Once there, teams had to drive to Wild World, where they had to follow a path to the crocodile pen. One team member had to use a feeding stick to feed a fish to a crocodile while their teammate took a picture with a digital camera. They then had to find the souvenir shop and develop their picture, where they found their next clue printed on the back.
 This leg's Detour was a choice between Saddle or Paddle. In Saddle, teams had to search a  stretch of beach on horseback in order to find one of four Route Markers, and then search a  radius for a cluster of clue envelopes. However, only one cluster contained the correct clue, while the other three instructed them to try again. In Paddle, teams would have had to inflate a kayak using a hand pump, push the kayak into the ocean, and paddle to an orange buoy in order to get their next clue. All teams chose to search the beach on horseback.
 In this leg's Roadblock, one team member had to drive a race buggy at high speeds through a bumpy  course in order to receive their next clue.
Teams had to check in at the pit stop: Ellis Beach.
Additional notes
This was a non-elimination leg.

Leg 13 (Australia → United States)

Episode 13: "It's Like Adam Building His First House!" (August 21, 2003)
Winners: Reichen & Chip
Second Place: Kelly & Jon
Third Place: David & Jeff
Locations
Ellis Beach (Ellis Beach) 
Smithfield (Tjapukai Aboriginal Cultural Park)
Cairns (Cairns Airport – General Aviation Terminal) 
 Cairns → Kona, Hawaii
Hawaii (Kaulana Bay) 
Hawaii (Hawaii Volcanoes National Park)
 Hilo  Kona → Phoenix, Arizona
Phoenix (USS Arizona Memorial)
Tempe (Sun Devil Stadium)
 Phoenix (Papago Park) 
Episode summary
At the start of this leg, teams made their way to the Tjapukai Aboriginal Cultural Park, where they observed a traditional Aboriginal ceremony. After the ceremony, teams were presented with their next clue, which directed them to the General Aviation Terminal at Cairns Airport.
 This season's final Detour was a choice between Wing It or Wander It. In Wing It, teams had to skydive  in tandem with an instructor in order to retrieve their next clue at the landing zone. In Wander It, teams would have had to drive to a mangrove forest, find a boat, and then navigate out of the forest to the skydive landing zone in order to retrieve their next clue. All teams chose to skydive.
Teams were then instructed to fly to the Big Island of Hawaii. Once there, teams had to drive to the southernmost point of the United States – Kaulana Bay – in order to find their next clue.
 In this season's final Roadblock, one team member had to swim out to a floating tiki head and then dive down to retrieve a large stone from the ocean floor. They then had to carry it back to the beach and smash it open using an assortment of tools in order to find the clue inside.
After completing the Roadblock, teams had to travel to Hawaii Volcanoes National Park, where they followed a marked path over a bed of volcanic rock to their next clue, which instructed them to fly to Phoenix, Arizona. Once there, teams had to find their next clue at the anchor of the USS Arizona at the Arizona Memorial.
Teams were instructed to make their way to Sun Devil Stadium, where they had to solve a riddle in order to locate a specific seat where they found their final clue directing them to the finish line at Papago Park.
Additional notes
David & Jeff, thinking they could get a faster flight to Hawaii through Sydney, were stranded in the Sydney Airport for so long that by the time they finally arrived in Hawaii, they received notification that the other teams had already crossed the finish line in Phoenix.

Reception

Critical response
Compared to the first three seasons, which were positively received, The Amazing Race 4 received more mixed reviews. Linda Holmes of Television Without Pity wrote "I loved a lot of things about the season, but that ending blew." Heather Havrilesky of Salon wrote that "'The Amazing Race' has always been an imaginative and well-produced show, but this year's lineup of couples has offered more hilarious calamities and personality clashes than usual." Kareem Gantt of Screen Rant wrote that "season four may not have had a cast that was particularly likable, but it did visit some cool locations". In 2016, this season was ranked 22nd out of the first 27 seasons by the Rob Has a Podcast Amazing Race correspondents.

Ratings
U.S. Nielsen ratings

References

External links
Official website

 04
2003 American television seasons
Television shows filmed in Los Angeles
Television shows filmed in Italy
Television shows filmed in Austria
Television shows filmed in Germany
Television shows filmed in France
Television shows filmed in the Netherlands
Television shows filmed in India
Television shows filmed in Singapore
Television shows filmed in Malaysia
Television shows filmed in South Korea
Television shows filmed in Australia
Television shows filmed in Japan
Television shows filmed in Hawaii
Television shows filmed in Arizona